Spilosoma fuscipennis is a moth in the family Erebidae. It was described by George Hampson in 1894. It is found in the Himalayas.

Description

Female

Antennae with the branches very short; thorax and abdomen dark reddish brown; palpi, frons at sides, and antennae black; legs streaked with blackish; abdomen with dorsal, lateral, and sublateral series of blackish points. Forewing fuscous brown; an indistinct curved antemedial line; an obscure discoidal point; the indistinct postmedial line angled at lower angle of cell, then strongly incurved. Hindwing pale greyish brown, with obscure discoidal point.

The female's wingspan is 48 mm.

References

Moths described in 1894
fuscipennis